Trogossitidae, also known as bark-gnawing beetles, are a small family in the superfamily Cleroidea. Many taxa formerly within this family have been removed (as of 2019) to other families, such as Lophocateridae, Peltidae, Protopeltidae, Rentoniidae, and Thymalidae. Members of the family are generally predatory and/or feed on fungi, both in adult and larval stages, and are generally associated with wood, being found under bark or inside bored tunnel galleries. There are about 400 species in 25 genera in the family under the new, restricted circumscription, as opposed to 600 species in over 50 genera in the old definition. The oldest fossil assignable to the modern, more restricted definition of the family is Microtrogossita from the mid-Cretaceous Burmese amber of Myanmar, which has close affinities to the Trogossitini, indicating that the family had already considerably diversified by this time.

Genera

 Acalanthis Erichson, 1844
 Airora Reitter, 1876
 Alindria Erichson
 Anacypta Illiger
 Calanthosoma Reitter
 Calitys Thomson, 1859
 Corticotomus Sharp, 1891
 Dupontiella Spinola
 Egolia Erichson, 1842
 Elestora Pascoe
 Eupycnus Sharp
 Euschaefferia Leng, 1920
 Gymnocheilis Dejean
 Kolibacia Leschen & Lackner, 2013
 Larinotus Carter & Zeck
 Leipaspis Wollaston, 1862
 Leperina Erichson, 1844
 Melambia Erichson
 Narcisa Pascoe
 Necrobiopsis Crowson, 1964
 Nemozoma Latreille, 1804
 Paracalanthis Crowson
 Parallelodera Fairmaire, 1881
 Phanodesta Reitter
 Seidlitzella Jakobson
 Temnoscheila Westwood, 1830
 Tenebroides Piller & Mitterpacher, 1783
 Xenoglena Reitter

References

External links

 
Polyphaga families